Pilot were a Scottish rock group, formed in 1973 in Edinburgh by David Paton and Billy Lyall. They are best known for their songs "January", "Magic", "Just a Smile" and "Call Me Round".

Career 

Paton and Lyall had briefly been substitute members of the Bay City Rollers before that band's breakthrough. Joined by drummer Stuart Tosh, the band recorded several demos during 1972 and 1974 at Craighall Studios, Edinburgh, where Billy Lyall was the resident engineer. They were signed to a management contract with Nick Heath and Tim Heath, sons of British bandleader Ted Heath, and John Cavanagh. In due course they signed to a worldwide recording deal with EMI Records. After the recording of their debut album, From the Album of the Same Name, guitarist Ian Bairnson (who had played on the album as a session musician) joined the band permanently.

The 1974 single "Magic" from their first album, produced by Alan Parsons and written by Lyall and Paton, was a No. 11 UK and No. 5 US success. It sold over one million copies, and was awarded a gold disc by the R.I.A.A. in August 1975. The song "January" gave them their greatest success in the UK, securing the number one spot in the UK Singles Chart on 1 February 1975. It stayed at number one for three weeks. It also went to number one in Australia where it stayed up top for eight weeks; in the United States, it reached the lower end of the Hot 100. However, the group failed to make the top 30 again. The arranger of "January", Andrew Powell, went on to record Kate Bush, and both Paton and Bairnson played on her debut album, The Kick Inside, which included "Wuthering Heights". Paton and Bairnson also played on Kate Bush's second album Lionheart (1978).

The band's other singles chart successes were "Call Me Round" and "Just a Smile" (both 1975), which each hit the top 40 in the UK and nowhere else. By 1977, only Paton and Bairnson were left from the original foursome, and after switching labels to Arista they recorded Pilot's final album Two's a Crowd with session musicians, including Steve Swindells, who later joined Hawklords.

By 1978, all of Pilot's members had begun other projects, with Tosh, Paton and Bairnson becoming members of the Alan Parsons Project, and Tosh also working with 10cc.

Lyall left Pilot and in 1976, as William Lyall, released a solo LP, Solo Casting, which included contributions from Paton and Bairnson, with Phil Collins drumming on all but two tracks. Lyall wrote all the songs, played keyboards and flute, and wrote all but two of the orchestral arrangements. Lyall died of AIDS-related causes in 1989.

Paton and Bairnson reconvened in 2002, to re-record the original Pilot album Two's a Crowd. The subsequent issue was entitled Blue Yonder.

As they approached the 40th anniversary of Pilot's debut album, Paton, Bairnson, and Tosh reunited as Pilot. They released A Pilot Project in August 2014 as an homage to The Alan Parsons Project mastermind Eric Woolfson.

In 2019, David Paton released a follow-up to A Pilot Project, The Traveller - Another Pilot Project. With a few exceptions, he recorded all the instruments himself.

In 2020, the label Cherry Red (Rough Trade) released a 4 CD box set containing all 4 albums of the band plus some rare recordings as bonus tracks.

In July 2021, Pilot (Paton and Bairnson) released The Magic EP, which features 4 completely re-recorded older songs: "Magic", "January", "Just a Smile" and "Over the Moon". "Over the Moon" was completely rearranged for this purpose. A compilation of Pilot's greatest hits The Magic Collection was released on 21 March 2022.

Band members
 David Paton – lead vocals, bass, Spanish guitar (1973–1977, 2002, 2007–)
 Billy Lyall – keyboards, flute, vocals (1973–1976) (died 1989)
 Steve Swindells – keyboards (1976–1977)
 Ian Bairnson – guitar (1974–1977, 2002, 2007–2016)
 Stuart Tosh – drums, percussion, vocals (1973–1977, 2007–2015)

Band members on live performances
 Kenny Hutchison – keyboards, vocals (2007–2017)
 Irvin Duguid – keyboards, vocals (2016–)
 Calais Brown – guitar, vocals (2007–2017)
 Dave Stewart – drums, percussion, vocals (2016–)

Discography

Studio albums

Compilation albums
Best of Pilot (1980)
The Magic Collection (2022)
A's B's & Rarities (2005)
The Craighall Demos 71:76 (2007)
Anthology (2007)
The Magic Collection (2022)

Singles

Soundtracks
Happy Gilmore (included in the soundtrack) (1996)
Herbie: Fully Loaded (included in the soundtrack) (2005)
The Magic Roundabout (included in the soundtrack) (2005)
Eve and the Firehorse ("Magic" included in the soundtrack) (2005)
Ozempic ("Magic" melody used as a jingle in pharmaceutical TV commercial) (2018)

See also
List of 1970s one-hit wonders in the United States

References

External links
 Official website
 Pilot biography by Greg Prato, discography and album reviews, credits & releases at AllMusic
 Pilot discography, album releases & credits at Discogs
 Pilot albums to be listened as stream on Spotify

Musical groups established in 1973
Scottish pop music groups
Scottish rock music groups
Scottish glam rock groups
British soft rock music groups
Musical groups from Edinburgh
EMI Records artists
Arista Records artists